Kristina Žumer (born 2 February 1980) is a retired Slovenian sprinter. She represented her country in the 4 × 100 meters relay at the 2003 World Championships. In addition she won a bronze medal in the 100 metres at the 2005 Mediterranean Games.

International competitions

Personal bests
Outdoor
100 metres – 11.50 (+0.5 m/s, Kaunas 2013)
200 metres – 23.51 (+0.8 m/s, Celje 2013)
400 metres – 55.22 (Sestriere 2004)
Long jump – 6.52 (+1.7 m/s, Dolenjske Toplice 2003)
Triple jump – 13.19 (Celje 2003)
Indoor
60 metres – 7.42 (Vienna 2004)
200 metres – 23.98 (Vienna 2012)
Long jump – 6.39 (Ljubljana 2003)

References

1980 births
Living people
Slovenian female sprinters
Slovenian female long jumpers
World Athletics Championships athletes for Slovenia
Mediterranean Games bronze medalists for Slovenia
Mediterranean Games medalists in athletics
Athletes (track and field) at the 2005 Mediterranean Games
Athletes (track and field) at the 2013 Mediterranean Games